The National Conference League is the top league in the pyramid of amateur rugby leagues. It was formerly run by the British Amateur Rugby League Association (BARLA) in winter but now forms tier 3 of the RFL's pyramid in summer .

Background
While in the early days rugby league had an established structure outside of the professional leagues with county-wide competitions and the like, this soon decayed into local district leagues usually only featuring teams from one or two towns with no input from the professional game. This eventually saw the number of amateur rugby league clubs reduce to a mere 150 in the early 1970s.

Against this background British Amateur Rugby League Association were formed in 1973. One of their first acts was to merge the vast majority of the district leagues into three regional leagues: the Yorkshire League, the Pennine League and the North Western Counties League. For geographical reasons the Hull League, the Cumberland League, the Barrow League and the London League were left as they were.

This allowed clubs to play at more appropriate standards as there were more divisions, and this factor along with the improved governance of BARLA saw the standard and numbers of clubs rise quickly. However, while there was a National Cup, the best amateur clubs were still divided between six leagues and thus the desire for an amateur National League arose.

National League

Early years
Against this background the BARLA National League was formed. The inaugural season was held in  1986–1987. The league received twenty-seven applications including five from the Barrow area alone, and more unusually, one from a London club- South London Warriors.

In the end the league settled on ten members, all from the northern strongholds of the game. These were four clubs from Yorkshire: Dudley Hill, Milford Marlins, Heworth and West Hull; four clubs from Lancashire: Pilkington Recs, Wigan St Patrick's, Woolston Rovers and Leigh Miners' Welfare; and two clubs from Cumbria: Egremont Rangers and Millom. These ten clubs were to be the members for each of the first three seasons.

1986/87
Champions: Heworth

1987/88
Champions: Milford Marlins

1988/89
Champions: West Hull

Two division era
The National League soon proved popular and for the 1989/90 season extended the top flight to twelve teams to include Lock Lane and Mayfield. However, this modest expansion wasn't enough and the 1989/90 season also saw the addition of a 10-team second division (to expand to 12 teams after one season).

The ten inaugural members of the second division were as follows: Saddleworth Rangers, Leigh East, British Aerospace, Barrow Island, Askam, Knottingley, Redhill, Dewsbury Celtic, Shaw Cross Sharks and East Leeds. This expansion was to prove successful with Leigh East becoming the first non-founder members to win the league in the 1990/91 season.

1989/90
Division 1
Champions: Dudley Hill
Relegated: Milford Marlins and Lock Lane
Division 2
Champions:Saddleworth Rangers
Also promoted: Leigh East
Elected to league for next season: Greetland Allrounders and Beverley

1990/91
Division 1
Champions: Leigh East
Relegated: West Hull
Resign from league: Pilkington Recs
Division 2
Champions: Barrow Island
Also promoted: Askam
Resign from league: Knottingley and British Aerospace
Elected to league for next season: Moldgreen, Walney Central and Oulton Raiders

1991/92
Division 1
Champions: Wigan St Patrick's
Relegated: Barrow Island and Mayfield
Division 2
Champions: West Hull
Also promoted: Dewsbury Celtic

1992/93
Division 1
Champions: Saddleworth Rangers
Division 2
Champions: Mayfield

National Conference League
In 1993 the RFL wanted to contract the professional ranks from 35 to 32 teams. However, their initial plan to place the excluded teams in the Alliance (reserve grade) faced a legal challenge so they needed an alternative competition to place them in. The RFL thus proposed a league to bridge the gap between the professional and amateur leagues to feature the three demoted semi-pro clubs plus Hemel Hempstead (who already played in the Alliance as a semi-pro club) and eight BARLA clubs.

However, BARLA wanted all National League clubs to be in any such league and since the RFL were in a tough legal position they were prepared to compromise with BARLA and thus the three division National Conference League was born. Other concessions made were an increase in the BARLA representation in the Challenge Cup from a mere 2 clubs to 64 and allowing the National Conference League champions to apply to replace the bottom team in the pro leagues.

However, the latter concession soon disappeared as the pro leagues moved to summer and the National Conference League did not want to move, furthermore Woolston Rovers' application to replace Highfield was voted out (the one club elected to the league from the National Conference League being Chorley Borough who were themselves a former semi-pro league club). The National Conference League soon expanded all divisions to 14 teams, though on occasions it has struggled to reach full complement of members, and lost all the remaining semi-pro clubs within three seasons.

Due to the switch of the pro game to summer the National Conference League gradually came to be seen as solely a BARLA league, despite being temporarily expelled from BARLA in 2002 , with only three National Conference League teams joining National League Three which was intended as a league to bridge the gap between the pro and amateur games. However, this was to change in 2008 when the National Conference League decided they did not like the path BARLA was taking and downgraded the league's BARLA membership from full to associate . In 2009 the National Conference League introduced a summer competition for clubs wanting to play year round as a test for a more permanent switch to summer which was to come in 2012.

Founder members of the National Conference League

Premier Division
From pro leagues: Chorley Borough, Blackpool Gladiators and Nottingham City
From Rugby League Alliance: Hemel Hempstead Stags
From National League Division 1: Dudley Hill, West Hull, Leigh Miners Welfare, Wigan St Patrick's, Woolston Rovers, Egremont Rangers, Saddleworth Rangers and Askam
Division 1
From National League Division 1: Dewsbury Celtic, Heworth, Millom and Leigh East
From National League Division 2: Lock Lane, Mayfield, Beverley, East Leeds, Walney Central and Oulton Raiders
Division 2
From National League Division 2: Barrow Island, Shaw Cross Sharks, Greetland Allrounders, Redhill, Moldgreen and Milford Marlins
Elected from Regional leagues: Oldham St Anne's, Blackbrook Royals, Eastmoor Dragons and York Acorn

1993/94

Premier Division
Champions: Woolston Rovers
Relegated: Blackpool Gladiators and Nottingham City
Division 1
Champions: Heworth
Also promoted: Mayfield
Relegated: none
Division 2
Champions: Oldham St Anne's
Also promoted: Moldgreen
Elected to league for next season: New Earswick All Blacks, Thornhill Trojans, Eccles & Salford Juniors and Northampton Knights

1994/95
Premier Division
Champions: Woolston Rovers
Elected to pro leagues: Chorley Borough
Relegated: Askam
Division 1
Champions: Millom
Also promoted: Lock Lane
Leave to join RL Alliance: Blackpool Gladiators
Folded: Nottingham City
Relegated: None
Division 2
Champions: Eastmoor Dragons
Also promoted: Thornhill Trojans and Blackbrook Royals
Expelled mid-season: Greetland Allrounders
Elected to league for next season: Hull Dockers, Wigan St Jude's, Ovenden and Normanton Knights

1995/96
Premier Division
Champions: Woolston Rovers
Leave to join RL Alliance: Hemel Hempstead Stags
Relegated: Millom
Division 1
Champions: Beverley
Also promoted: Oldham St Anne's
Resign from league: Dewsbury Celtic
Relegated: none
Division 2:
Champions: Wigan St Jude's
Also promoted: Barrow Island
Expelled and folded mid-season: Northampton Knights
Elected to league for next season: Dewsbury Moor, Skirlaugh and Featherstone Amateurs

1996/97
Premier Division
Champions:West Hull
Relegated: none
Division 1
Champions: Askam
Also promoted: Walney Central
Relegated: Millom
Division 2
Champions: Redhill
Also promoted: Milford Marlins, Skirlaugh and Shaw Cross Sharks
Elected to league for next season: Crosfields, Dodworth, London Skolars and Siddal

1997/98
Premier Division
Champions: Egremont Rangers
Relegated: Mayfield and Castleford Lock Lane
Division 1
Champions: Skirlaugh
Also promoted: Thornhill Trojans
Resign from league: Moldgreen
Relegated: Blackbrook Royals
Division 2
Champions: Featherstone Lions
Also promoted: Siddal and Millom
Elected to league for next season: Ideal Isberg and Keighley Albion

1998/99
Premier Division
Champions: West Hull
Resign from league: Egremont Rangers and Beverley
Relegated: Heworth
Division 1
Champions: Redhill
Also promoted: Castleford Lock Lane
Relegated: Milford and Eastmoor Dragons
Division 2
Champions: Ideal Isberg
Also promoted: Eccles & Salford Juniors and Blackbrook Royals
Expelled from league: Ovenden (mid-season) and Dodworth
Elected to league for next season: Sheffield Hillsborough Hawks, Castleford Panthers, Waterhead and West Bowling

1999/2000
Premier Division
Champions: West Hull
Relegated: Askam
Division 1
Champions: Oulton Raiders
Also promoted: Ideal Isberg
Resigned from league: Barrow Island
Relegated: Blackbrook Royals
Division 2
Champions: Eastmoor Dragons
Also promoted: Waterhead and West Bowling
Elected to league for next season: Thatto Heath Crusaders and Cottingham Tigers

2000/01
Premier Division
Champions: West Hull
Relegated: Dudley Hill and Redhill
Division 1
Champions: Leigh East
Also promoted: Siddal
Relegated: Heworth and Millom
Division 2
Champions: Thatto Heath Crusaders
Also promoted: Hull Dockers
Expelled from league: Blackbrook Royals
Resigned from league: London Skolars
Not re-elected: New Earswick All Blacks
Elected to league for next season: Hunslet Warriors

2001/02
Premier Division
Champions: West Hull
Relegated: Walney Central and Saddleworth Rangers
Division 1
Champions: West Bowling
Also promoted: East Leeds
Relegated: Rochdale Mayfield and Eastmoor Dragons
Division 2
Champions: Crosfield
Also promoted: Hunslet Warriors
Resigned from league: Keighley Albion and Dewsbury Moor
Elected to league for next season: Wath Brow Hornets, Huddersfield Sharks and Widnes St Mary's

2002/03
Premier Division
Champions: Siddal
Resigned to join National League 3: Woolston Rovers
Relegated: East Leeds
Division 1
Champions: Thatto Heath Crusaders
Also promoted: Featherstone Lions
Expelled mid-season: Redhill
Relegated: Waterhead
Division 2
Champions: Wath Brow Hornets
Also promoted: Milford Marlins
Resigned to join National League 3: Sheffield Hillsborough Hawks
Elected to league for next season: East Hull and Ince Rose Bridge

2003/04
Premier Division
Champions: Siddal
Relegated: Castleford Lock Lane, Ideal Isberg and Featherstone Lions
Division 1
Champions: Wath Brow Hornets
Also promoted: Wigan St Jude's and Hull Dockers
Resigned from league to focus on National League 3: Dudley Hill
Relegated: Saddleworth Rangers and Crosfields
Division 2
Champions: East Hull
Also promoted: Castleford Panthers and Rochdale Mayfield
Elected to league for next season: Ovenden and Stanningley

2004/05
Premier Division
Champions: Leigh Miners Rangers
Relegated: West Hull, West Bowling and Thatto Heath Crusaders
Division 1
Champions: Shaw Cross Sharks
Also promoted: East Hull and Eccles & Salford Juniors
Relegated: Castleford Panthers and Featherstone Lions
Division 2
Champions: Ince Rose Bridge
Also promoted: Eastmoor Dragons and York Acorn
Resigned from league: Cottingham Tigers
Elected to league for next season: Egremont Rangers

2005/06
Premier Division
Champions: Oulton Raiders
Relegated: Eccles & Salford Juniors, Leigh East and Wigan St Jude's
Division 1
Champions: West Hull
Also promoted: West Bowling and Eastmoor Dragons
Expelled from league: Hunslet Warriors
Resigned from league: Walney Central
Relegated: Askam and Ideal Isberg
Division 2
Champions: Castleford Panthers
Also promoted: Ovenden and Widnes St Mary's
Resigned from league: Featherstone Lions (mid-season) and Huddersfield Sharks
Elected to league: Bradford Dudley Hill and Brighouse Rangers

2006/07
Premier Division
Champions: Skirlaugh
Relegated: Oldham St Annes, Wath Brow Hornets and Shaw Cross Sharks
Division 1
Champions: Rochdale Mayfield
Also promoted:  Leigh East and Castleford Panthers
Relegated: Castleford Lock Lane, Milford Marlins and Ovenden
Division 2
Champions: Waterhead
Also promoted: Bradford Dudley Hill and Saddleworth Rangers
Elected to league for next season: Stanley Rangers

2007/08
Premier Division
Champions: East Hull
Relegated: Castleford Panthers, West Bowling and Eastmoor Dragons
Division 1
Champions: Wigan St Jude's
Also promoted: York Acorn and Thatto Heath Crusaders
Relegated: Eccles & Salford Juniors, Waterhead and East Leeds
Division 2
Champions: Millom
Also promoted: Stanningley and Normanton Knights
Expelled from league mid-season: Brighouse Rangers
Resigned from league: Askam
Elected to league for next season: Myton Warriors

2008/09
Premier Division
Champions: Siddal
Relegated: Thatto Heath Crusaders, Rochdale Mayfield and Thornhill Trojans
Division 1
Champions: Wath Brow Hornets
Also promoted: Ince Rose Bridge and Widnes St Mary's
Relegated: Eastmoor Dragons, Shaw Cross Sharks and Oldham St Anne's
Division 2
Champions: Myton Warriors
Also promoted: Milford Marlins and Heworth 
Resigned from league: Hull Isberg

2009/10
Premier Division
Champions: Leigh East
Relegated: Oulton Raiders, Ince Rose Bridge and Widnes St Mary's
Division 1
Champions: Thatto Heath Crusaders
Also promoted: Bradford Dudley Hill and Saddleworth Rangers
Relegated: West Bowling and Heworth
Resigned from league: Thornhill Trojans
Division 2
Champions: Eccles & Salford Juniors
Also promoted: Oldham St Anne's and Stanley Rangers
Elected to league: Hunslet Warriors and Elland

2010/2011
Premier Division
Champions: Thatto Heath Crusaders
Relegated: Bradford Dudley Hill, Wigan St Jude's and York Acorn
Division 1
Champions: Oulton Raiders 
Also promoted: Myton Warriors and Ince Rose Bridge
Relegated: Normanton Knights
Resigned midseason: Widnes St Maries
Division 2
Champions: Hunslet Warriors
Also promoted: Egremont Rangers and Castleford Lock Lane
Resigned from league: West Bowling
Elected to league for transitional season: Askam and Widnes West Bank
Elected to league for summer 2012 season: Featherstone Lions and Dewsbury Celtic

2011 Transitional Season
To allow clubs to switch to the summer season more easily a short season was carried out from August to November 2011 with the following group format:

Group A: Egremont Rangers, Leigh East, Leigh Miners Rangers, Thatto Heath Crusaders, Wath Brow Hornets
Group B: Askam, Ince Rose Bridge, Millom, Wigan St Jude's, Wigan St Patrick's
Group C: Elland, Ovenden, Rochdale Mayfield, Saddleworth Rangers, Siddal
Group D: East Leeds, Hunslet Warriors, Milford Marlins, Oulton Raiders, Stanningley
Group E: Crosfield, Eccles & Salford, Oldham St Anne's, Waterhead, Widnes West Bank
Group F: Castleford Lock Lane, Catleford Panthers, Eastmoor Dragons, Normanton Knights, Stanley Rangers
Group G: Bradford Dudley Hill, Heworth, Shaw Cross Sharks, York Acorn (West Bowling withdrew)
Group H: East Hull, Hull Dockers, Myton Warriors, Skirlaugh, West Hull

Clubs played 12 league games (home and away in their pool and two other clubs home and away), then there were playoffs. There was also a reserve team league.

Summer Era
From 2012 the Conference played in summer, as tier 3 of the new pyramid, and the initial season saw two former Rugby League Conference National Division clubs admitted (Dewsbury Celtic and Featherstone Lions) with others expected to join from 2013. For one season only the Rugby League Conference National Division ran as Conference division three with no automatic promotion to division two, but after this, all northern clubs were  required to meet full Conference criteria to play in tier 3. The RFL also had ambitions of a Conference South  which would leave the former National Conference League as Conference North. From 2013, the limit on member clubs was raised from 42 to 56 and saw an increase to four divisions.

Admitted to division 3 for 2012
Bramley Buffaloes, Bristol Sonics, Coventry Bears, Hemel Stags, Huddersfield Underbank Rangers, Kippax Knights, Nottingham Outlaws, St Albans Centurions and Valley Cougars. Valley Cougars withdrew and were replaced by South Wales Hornets

2012
Premier Division
Champions: Wath Brow Hornets
Relegated: Oulton Raiders and Saddleworth Rangers
Demoted to division 2 (for non-fulfilment of fixture): Leigh East
Division 1
Champions: Egremont Rangers
Also promoted: Castleford Lock Lane and York Acorn
Relegated: Stanningley, Oldham St Anne's and Castleford Panthers
Division 2
Champions: East Leeds
Also promoted: Waterhead and Dewsbury Celtic
Demoted to division 3 (for non-fulfilment of fixture): Crosfields, Featherstone Lions and Heworth
Division 3
Champions (elected to Championship 1): Hemel Stags
Remain in division 3 for 2013: Huddersfield Underbank Rangers and Coventry Bears
Demoted to Conference League South: Nottingham Outlaws, Bristol Sonics and St Albans Centurions
Demoted to Yorkshire Men's League: Bramley Buffaloes and Kippax Knights
Folded: Warrington Wizards (joined Woolston Rovers) and South Wales Hornets
Accepted into division 3 for 2013: Kells, Pilkington Recs, Hindley, Wigan St Cuthbert's, Peterlee Pumas, Blackbrook and Woolston Rovers.

2013
Premier Division
Champions: Thatto Heath Crusaders
Relegated: Ince Rose Bridge, Myton Warriors and York Acorn
Division 1
Champions: East Leeds
Also promoted: Hunslet Warriors and Wigan St Judes
Demoted to Division 2: Bradford Dudley Hill
Relegated: Stanley Rangers and Waterhead
Division 2
Champions: Normanton Knights
Also promoted: Shaw Cross Sharks
Relegated: Eastmoor Dragons
Pulled out mid-season: Widnes West Bank
Division 3
Champions: Kells
Also promoted: Pilkington Recs

2014
Premier Division
Champions: West Hull
Relegated: Skirlaugh, Hunslet Warriors and Wigan St Judes
Resigned midseason: East Hull
Division 1
Champions: Oulton Raiders
Also promoted: Rochdale Mayfield
Relegated: Dewsbury Celtic and Millom
NB: Eccles merged with non-league Irlam Hornets to form Salford City Roosters for the 2015 season
Division 2
Champions: Kells
Also promoted: Elland and Pilkington Recs
Relegated: Waterhead and Stanningley
Resigned after season: Ovenden
Division 3
Champions: Featherstone Lions
Also promoted: Blackbrook and Underbank Rangers
Elected to League 1: Coventry Bears
Resigned midseason: Wigan St Cuthberts
Resigned after season: Hindley; Peterlee Pumas
Elected to league for next season: Dewsbury Moor, Drighlington, Gateshead Storm, Hunslet Club Parkside, Thornhill Trojans and Wibsey Warriors

2015
Premier Division
Champions: Leigh Miners Rangers
Relegated: East Leeds, Oulton Raiders and Thatto Heath Crusaders
Division 1
Champions: Kells
Also promoted: Pilkington Recs and York Acorn
Relegated: Saddleworth Rangers, Salford City Roosters and Wigan St Judes
Division 2
Champions: Millom
Also promoted: Featherstone Lions and Underbank Rangers
Relegated: Oldham St Annes 
Resigned midseason: Castleford Panthers
Division 3
Champions: Hunslet Club Parkside
Also promoted: Stanningley and Thornhill Trojans
Resigned midseason: Heworth
Resigned after season: Wibsey Warriors
Elected to league for next season: Castleford Panthers and Rylands Sharks

2016
Premier Division
Champions: Siddal
Relegated: Hull Dockers, Lock Lane and York Acorn
Division 1
Champions: Thatto Heath Crusaders
Also promoted: Myton Warriors and Skirlaugh
Relegated: East Leeds, Millom and Oulton Raiders
Demoted to division 3: Elland
Division 2
Champions: Hunslet Club Parkside
Also promoted: Blackbrook
Relegated: Dewsbury Celtic, Stanley Rangers and Stanningley 
Division 3
Champions: Crosfields
Also promoted: Drighlington
Resigned midseason: Castleford Panthers
Elected to league for next season: Barrow Island, Clock Face Miners and West Bowling

2017
Premier Division
Champions: Thatto Heath Crusaders
Relegated: Leigh Miners Rangers, Pilkington Recs and Skirlaugh
Division 1
Champions: Hunslet Club Parkside
Also promoted: Normanton Knights and Underbank Rangers
Relegated: Hull Dockers and Hunslet Warriors
Failed to complete the season and demoted to division 3: Blackbrook
Division 2
Champions: Oulton Raiders
Also promoted: Bradford Dudley Hill and Thornhill Trojans
Relegated: Leigh East, Millom and Salford City Roosters
Division 3
Champions: West Bowling
Also promoted: Dewsbury Moor Maroons and Stanningley
Resigned midseason: Elland and Rylands Sharks
Elected to league for next season: Beverley

2018
Premier Division
Champions: Hunslet Club Parkside
Relegated: Normanton Knights, Wigan St Patricks and Myton Warriors
Division 1
Champions: Thornhill Trojans
Also promoted: Lock Lane and Leigh Miners Rangers
Relegated: Ince Rose Bridge, Shaw Cross Sharks and Bradford Dudley Hill
Division 2
Champions: Stanningley
Also promoted: Dewsbury Moor Maroons
Relegated: Drighlington, Hunslet Warriors and Leigh East
Division 3
Champions: Beverley
Also promoted: Barrow Island and Clock Face Miners
Resigned after season: Stanley Rangers
Elected to league for next season: Batley Boys, Heworth, Hensingham

Sources
https://www.nationalconferenceleague.co.uk - former National Conference League official website
https://www.rugby-league.com/leagues__competitions/national_conference_league - National Conference League official website
The Times newspaper archives (results section 1986 onwards plus several articles from 1986 and 1993 about the formation of the National League and National Conference League respectively)

External links 
 Official site
 BARLA Official Website

National Conference League
Rugby league competitions in the United Kingdom
Amateur rugby league